is a former Japanese football player.

Club statistics

References

External links

j-league

1986 births
Living people
Hosei University alumni
Association football people from Kanagawa Prefecture
Japanese footballers
J2 League players
Shonan Bellmare players
Mito HollyHock players
Association football forwards